Independence Township is a township in Jasper County, Iowa, USA.

History
Independence Township was established in 1858.

References

Townships in Jasper County, Iowa
Townships in Iowa
1858 establishments in Iowa
Populated places established in 1858